Horney Robinson House, also known as the Gary Coffee Residence, is a historic home located in Wayne Township, Allen County, Indiana.  It was built about 1845, and is a two-story, five bay, Federal style frame dwelling.  It has a side-gable roof and original native walnut interior woodwork.

It was listed on the National Register of Historic Places in 1985.

References

Houses on the National Register of Historic Places in Indiana
Federal architecture in Indiana
Houses completed in 1845
Houses in Allen County, Indiana
National Register of Historic Places in Allen County, Indiana